Desamparados is a district of the Desamparados canton, in the San José province of Costa Rica.

Geography 
Desamparados has an area of  km2 and an elevation of  metres.

Demographics 

For the 2011 census, Desamparados had a population of  inhabitants.

Transportation

Road transportation 
The district is covered by the following road routes:
 National Route 175
 National Route 206
 National Route 207
 National Route 209
 National Route 213

References 

Districts of San José Province
Populated places in San José Province